Events from the year 1768 in Sweden

Incumbents
 Monarch – Adolf Frederick

Events

 12 December – The King lays down the government, which creates the December Crisis (1768), that cause the parliament to call the Riksdag of the Estates. 
 18 December – The monarch resume the government.
 - The ecstatic religious movement of Karin Olofsdotter begins.

Births

 - Charlotta Malm-Reuterholm, painter  (died 1845)

Deaths

 14 December - Ulla Tessin, courtier  (born 1711)

References

 
Years of the 18th century in Sweden
Sweden